Calhoun Hill is a mountain located in the Catskill Mountains of New York east-southeast of Delhi. Bryden Mountain is located northwest, Hemlock Knoll is located south-southeast, and Craig Hill is located west of Calhoun Hill.

References

Mountains of Delaware County, New York
Mountains of New York (state)